1993 J.League Cup Final was the 2nd final of the J.League Cup competition. The final was played at National Stadium in Tokyo on November 23, 1993. Verdy Kawasaki won the championship.

Match details

See also
1993 J.League Cup

References

J.League Cup
1993 in Japanese football
Tokyo Verdy matches
Shimizu S-Pulse matches